André Marius Lacoste, known as Jep Lacoste (11 February 1922 – 22 June 1988) was a French rugby league coach.

Biography 
Lacoste, originally a player of Villeneuve-sur-Lot, his playing career was compromised due to his STO in Upper Silesia, which left him physically dilapidated.
Lacoste was the coach of his former club, Villeneuve-sur-Lot, which he led to a historic double in the 1964–65 season, as well he coached France at the 1968 Rugby League World Cup. Lacoste also coached the Saint-Gaudens side which won the French Championship final in the 1969–70 season against XIII Catalan.

After his death in 1988, a rugby sevens tournament with 12 rugby league teams and two rugby union teams from the south-west France, was inaugurated by the then-president of the French Rugby League Federation, Puig Aubert, with the name "Jep Lacoste Trophy" in his honour.

Honours 
 Rugby league :
 World Cup :
 Runner-up in 1968 (France).
 French Championship :
Champion in 1964 (Villeneuve-sur-Lot).
Champion in 1970 (Saint-Gaudens).
Runner-up in 1965 and 1974  (Villeneuve-sur-Lot).
 Lord Derby Cup :
 Champion in 1964 (Villeneuve-sur-Lot).
 Runner-up in 1966 (Villeneuve-sur-Lot).

References

External links 
Jean-Pierre (sic) Lacoste coaching stats at rugbyleagueproject.com

1922 births
1988 deaths
CA Périgueux coaches
France national rugby league team coaches
French rugby league players
French World War II forced labourers
Rugby league coaches
Saint-Gaudens Bears coaches
Sportspeople from Toulouse
Villeneuve Leopards coaches
Villeneuve Leopards players